Gatenby is a secluded village and civil parish in the Hambleton district of North Yorkshire, England. It is situated about two miles east of the A1(M) road, near to the River Swale. Nearby is RAF Leeming.  The population of the parish was estimated at 40 in 2010. At the 2011 Census the population remained less than 100. Details are included in the civil parish of Exelby, Leeming and Londonderry.

The place name is found in the Domesday Book as Ghetenesbi, the meaning is unclear, one interpretation is "goat's tongue ridge farm", a farm situated on a narrow ridge.

From the place name, there is a derivative English surname, see Gatenby (name).

References

External links

 Gatenby homepage Gatenby homepage with genealogy information

Villages in North Yorkshire
Civil parishes in North Yorkshire